Argotec is an aerospace engineering company based in Turin whose research, innovation and product development activities use engineering and computing for space applications and renewable energy systems. Particular attention is also given to the field of Human Space Flight and Operations as well as the development of space exploration systems. Argotec is also concerned with the production of nanosatellites and engineering solutions that can be adopted on the International Space Station (ISS), which also have immediate applications on Earth.

History 
After having worked with several foreign aerospace and defense companies, David Avino returned to work in Italy and on March the 12th 2008 he founded Argotec, an aerospace engineering company that from the beginning selected his collaborators among Italian and foreign graduates; the average age of employees is about 29. In 2009 Argotec started its training activities at the European Astronaut Centre (EAC) in Cologne.  NASA certified Argotec instructors train European astronauts, flight controllers and the ground crew who provide support during space operations.

Headquarters of via Polonghera in Turin
In 2010, in this laboratory the research and development activities focused on heat pipes started. The heat pipes are devices that take advantage of the fluid change of phase to transfer heat in a passive way. It is a well-known technology in a scientific field, but at the moment there are not many producers in Europe and Italy limits itself to buying European products.

From the know-how developed through the activities for Space, Argotec has diversified its work and it started research activities and the production of the space food for astronauts. In 2010 the company developed independently a new research area for the study of nutritional food dedicated to the astronauts, the Space Food Lab. Argotec Chef, food technologists and nutritionists have studied and produced the bonus food for some European astronauts such as Luca Parmitano, Samantha Cristoforetti, Alexander Gerst and Paolo Nespoli.

Headquarters of via Cervino in Turin (current headquarters) 
In January 2014 the new headquarters on via Cervino was inaugurated with increased spaces that contain different laboratories for specific activities:
 an electronic laboratory,
 a thermal laboratory,
 a multi-functional laboratory,
 a laboratory focused on the study and the production of space food.

These are equipped with specific tools for the integration and the testing of models for development, qualification or flight.  There are also climatic rooms and a thermal vacuum chamber in order to recreate the extreme conditions of temperature and to validate the projects. Argotec has also a Clean Room (ISO 5, Class 100) for the integration and the test of flight parts, included optics sensible to contaminated environments.

Argotec has its own Mission Control Centre directly connected with NASA control centres where Argotec engineers can control and support the operations done onboard the International Space Station in real-time.

Research and development 

The research and development activity in the heat pipe field allowed the company to develop an internal numerical model that, coupled with an optimization model, permits the design of heat pipes maximizing efficiency with the correct selection of macroscopic geometry (tube diameter and length) and microscopic (groove).

Particular attention was paid to the choice of fluids. The analysis and tests were focused on low toxicity fluids that can allow, but is not limited to, use of these devices in inhabited space modules. In fact the systems studied could also be adopted  to heat the home environment increasing the efficiency of the heat transfer systems (from the source – boiler, solar concentrator, etc. – to the room to warm up).

The use of the phase change of a fluid with its simple heating are able to allow, in similar conditions, such as the type of fluid used and the dimensions of the domestic heating system, the transport of a greater quantity of heat and also energy savings.  Among the projects born after the research and development activities in thermal the field we can include: RAH (Renewable passive heat system), HEAT (Heat Exchanging pAssive Technology), ARTE (Advanced Research for passive Thermal Exchange) and INWIP (Innovative Wickless Heat Pipe Systems for Ground and space applications).

The Argotec know-how is also extended to the design of electronic power system, the development of on board computers and on board software, the choice and integration of COTS components and finally to customization following the specific characteristics imposed by the project.

In addition to these skills Argotec also has knowledge of ESA and NASA (ECSS and SSP) standards, and familiarity with safety and integration processes with the ISS required by NASA for all experiments and systems that fly onboard the ISS.

Projects 
In order to study some physical phenomenon about the fluid dynamics of liquids in high temperatures and pressures in microgravity condition, the ISSpresso was born, the first espresso capsule coffee machine for Space. It was developed by Argotec and Lavazza, in a public-private partnership with the Italian Space Agency. On 3 May 2015 this experiment was successfully conducted by Samantha Cristoforetti and it will be utilized again in microgravity conditions by the Italian astronaut Paolo Nespoli during his next space mission.

During the research activity on heat pipes, looking to the Space, in 2014 ARTE (Advanced Research for passive Thermal Exchange) was born in order to verify the behaviour of some heat pipes containing low toxicity fluids in microgravity conditions. This payload, coordinated by the Italian Space Agency (ASI), was successfully conducted in on 4 April 2016 on board the International Space Station by the American astronaut Timothy Kopra and it will be utilized again by Paolo Nespoli during his VITA mission scheduled for July 2017.

In September 2015 NASA published an announcement for the participation of 13 small satellites (6U, CubeSat standard) in the Artemis 1 mission. One among the evaluated proposals by the Italian Space Agency, by the European Space Agency and finally selected by NASA was ArgoMoon, a project designed by Argotec. ArgoMoon will be the only European satellite to participate in the EM-1 mission. Developed in collaboration with the Italian Space Agency, the objective of the ArgoMoon mission is to provide NASA information about proper launch vehicle operations through photography. Moreover, it will be able to test nano-technologies in the adverse conditions of translunar trajectory. A unique opportunity for the research of new solutions in order to expand the use of nanosatellites to future exploration and to support the low cost observation of the Earth.

References 

Companies based in Turin
Aerospace companies of Italy